David L. Pokress is an American photojournalist.  In the 1980s, he worked for New York's Newsday. In 1992 he worked for Esquire. He is currently a photo assignment editor at the Daily News in New York, and has served as the President of the New York Press Photographers Association since 2011.

References

American photojournalists
Living people
Year of birth missing (living people)